The Austin 250hp gas turbine was a free turbine turboshaft engine developed by Dr John Weaving at the Austin Motor Company. It was a development of an earlier engine that had been used in the experimental Austin Princess car TUR1.  Various uses for the engine were suggested such as mobile power unit and Hospital Backup Generator but it did not find any commercial use. More powerful derivates were developed but these also found no uses

References

1950s turboshaft engines
Cars powered by gas turbines
250hp gas turbine